
This is a list of the 45 players who earned 1994 PGA Tour cards through the PGA Tour Qualifying Tournament in 1993.

 PGA Tour rookie in 1994

1994 Results

*PGA Tour rookie in 1994
T = Tied
 The player retained his PGA Tour card for 1995 (finished inside the top 125, excluding non-members)
 The player did not retain his PGA Tour card for 1995, but retained conditional status (finished between 126-150, excluding non-members)
 The player did not retain his PGA Tour card for 1995 (finished outside the top 150)

Winners on the PGA Tour in 1994

Runners-up on the PGA Tour in 1994

See also
1993 Nike Tour graduates

References

PGA Tour Qualifying School
PGA Tour Qualifying School Graduates
PGA Tour Qualifying School Graduates